Bhagwan Datt Sharma(23 October 1935) is a well-known person in the field of English and Hindi literature specially of post World War II period in Madhya Pradesh and reforms in school education. He had been Deputy Divisional Superintendent of Education at the time of his retirement, he is also father in law of first daughter of Ram Kishore Shukla who was a preeminent politician from Indian National Congress. He is among the prime founders of Socialist Party in Rewa.
He is a Doctor of Philosophy awarded so for Comparison of Hindi & English poetry in post World War II period, before that he earned B.A. (English), M.A. (Hindi Literature), M.A. (English literature). He has always been admired for his depth of knowledge of Scandinavian literature, Latin literature, English and Hindi poetry.

Citations

1935 births
Hindi-language poets
Living people
People from Rewa, Madhya Pradesh
Poets from Madhya Pradesh
People from Rewa district